Varaždin County is a county in Hrvatsko Zagorje. It is named after its county seat, the city of Varaždin.

Geography

The county contains the city of Varaždin, the towns of: Ivanec, Ludbreg, Lepoglava, Novi Marof and Varaždinske Toplice, as well as 22 municipalities.

Varaždin County borders Slovenia to the northwest, Međimurje County to the north, Krapina-Zagorje County to the southwest, Zagreb County to the south, and Koprivnica-Križevci County to the southeast, with a small portion of the latter separating it from Hungary.

The Drava flows along the northern border of the county. There are three reservoirs on the river – Lake Ormož, Lake Varaždin and Lake Dubrava. All of them are partially located within the county. Another river flowing through the county is the Bednja, which also confluences with the Drava within the county. There are also the mountains of Ivanščica (also known as Ivančica) and Kalnik.

Transport

The highway A4 (part of Pan-European Corridor Vb and European route E65) passes through the county, connecting the Hungarian border (in the north) with Zagreb (in the south), and which has exits in Varaždin, Varaždinske Toplice and Novi Marof. In the longitudinal (east-west) direction, a magistral road passes along the Drava river, spanning from Maribor (Slovenia) to Osijek. Railways (not yet modernised) passing through the county lead to Zagreb in the south, Čakovec and Budapest (Hungary) in the north and Koprivnica in the east.

Economy

The economy of Varaždin County is focused on the manufacturing industry, particularly on the following industrial branches: milk products processing, beverage production, meat-packing industry, clothing and textiles industry, metal manufacturing industry, leather footwear industry, manufacturing of high-quality wood furniture and other lumber products.

Administrative division
Varaždin county is divided into:

 City of Varaždin (county seat)
 Town of Ludbreg
 Town of Lepoglava
 Town of Ivanec
 Town of Novi Marof
 Town of Varaždinske Toplice
 Municipality of Bednja
 Municipality of Beretinec
 Municipality of Breznica
 Municipality of Breznički Hum
 Municipality of Cestica
 Municipality of Donja Voća
 Municipality of Donji Martijanec
 Municipality of Gornji Kneginec
 Municipality of Jalžabet
 Municipality of Klenovnik
 Municipality of Ljubešćica
 Municipality of Mali Bukovec
 Municipality of Maruševec
 Municipality of Petrijanec
 Municipality of Sračinec
 Municipality of Sveti Đurđ
 Municipality of Sveti Ilija
 Municipality of Trnovec Bartolovečki
 Municipality of Veliki Bukovec
 Municipality of Vidovec
 Municipality of Vinica
 Municipality of Visoko

Demographics

According to the 2011 census, Varaždin County has a population of 175,951. Ethnic Croats make up a majority with 97.9% of the population.

See also

 Roman Catholic Diocese of Varaždin

References

External links
 

 
Counties of Croatia